Jérôme Sébastien Alonzo (born 20 November 1972) is a French former professional footballer who played as a goalkeeper.

Honours
Nice
Division 2: 1993–94

Paris Saint-Germain
UEFA Intertoto Cup: 2001
Coupe de France: 2005–06
Coupe de la Ligue: 2007–08

References

External links

1972 births
Living people
People from Menton
Sportspeople from Alpes-Maritimes
French footballers
Association football goalkeepers
OGC Nice players
Olympique de Marseille players
AS Saint-Étienne players
Paris Saint-Germain F.C. players
FC Nantes players
Ligue 2 players
Ligue 1 players
Footballers from Provence-Alpes-Côte d'Azur